The Monkey King, also known as Sun Wukong in Mandarin Chinese, is a legendary mythical figure. It is best known as one of the main characters in the 16th-century Chinese novel Journey to the West and many later stories and adaptations. In said novel, Sun Wukong is a monkey born from a stone who acquires supernatural powers through Taoist practices. After rebelling against heaven, he is imprisoned under a mountain by the Buddha. After five hundred years, he accompanies the monk Tang Sanzang (唐三藏) and two other disciples on a journey to get back Buddhist sutras from the West (India), where Buddha and his followers dwell.

Sun Wukong possesses many abilities. He has amazing strength and is able to support the weight of two heaven mountains on his shoulders while running "with the speed of a meteor". He is extremely fast, able to travel 108,000 li (54,000 km, 34,000 mi) in one somersault. He has amazing memory skills and can remember every monkey ever born. As king of the monkeys it is his duty to keep track of and protect every monkey. Sun Wukong also acquires the 72 Earthly Transformations, which allow him to access 72 unique powers, including the ability to transform into sundry animals and objects. He is a skilled fighter, capable of defeating the best warriors of heaven. His hair has magical properties, capable of making copies of himself or transforming into various weapons, animals and other things. He also shows partial weather manipulation skills and can stop people in place with fixing magic.

History

As one of the most enduring Chinese literary characters, the Monkey King has a varied and highly debated background and colorful cultural history. His inspiration might have come from an amalgam of influences. 
 
One source for inspiration came from differing ways gibbons were worshipped during the Chinese Chu kingdom (700–223 BC), and various legends about gibbons and monkeys in Chu and its successors. These legends and religious practices, alongside doctrine from Taoist organizations that reinforced them and combined elements from all five kinds of traditional religious Taoism, gave rise to stories and art motifs during the Han dynasty, eventually contributing to the Monkey King figure.    

Some believe the association with Xuanzang is based on the first disciple of Xuanzang, Shi Banto.   

Hu Shih first suggested that Wu Cheng'en was possibly influenced by the Hindu deity Hanuman from the Ramayana in  his depictions of the Monkey King, via stories passed by Buddhists who traveled to China. However, others such as Lu Xun point out there is no proof that the Ramayana has been translated into Chinese or was accessible to Wu Cheng'en. Instead, Lu Xun suggested the 9th Century Chinese deity Wuzhiqi, who appears as a sibling of Sun Wukong in older Yuan Dynasty stories, as another potential inspiration.  

Sun Wukong may have also been influenced by local folk religion from Fuzhou province, where monkey gods were worshipped long before the novel. This included the three Monkey Saints of Lin Shui Palace, who were once fiends, who were subdued by the goddess Chen Jinggu, the Empress Lin Shui. The three were Dan Xia Da Sheng, the Red Face Monkey Sage, Tong Tian Da Sheng, the Black Face Monkey Sage, and Shuang Shuang San Lang, the White Face Monkey Sage. The two traditional mainstream religions practiced in Fuzhou are Mahayana Buddhism and Taoism. Traditionally, many people practice both religions simultaneously. However, the roots of local religion dated back many years before institutionalization of these traditions. 

These diverse religions embodied elements such as gods and doctrines from different provincial folk religions and cultures, such as totem worship and traditional legends. Though there are primarily two main religions in China, since it is so big, different folk stories will vary from towns, cities, and provinces with their own myths about different deities. Sun Wukong's religious status in Buddhism is often denied by Buddhist monks both Chinese and non-Chinese alike, but is very welcomed by the general public, spreading its name around the world and establishing itself as a cultural icon.

Background

Birth and early life of Sun Wukong

According to Journey to the West, the Monkey King is born from a strong magic stone that sits atop the Mountain of Flowers and Fruit. This stone is no ordinary stone, however, because it receives the nurture of heaven (yang), which possesses a positive nature, and earth (yin), which possesses a negative nature, and thus is able to produce living beings (according to Taoist philosophies). The stone develops a magic womb, which bursts open one day to produce a stone egg about the size of a ball.

When the wind blows on the egg, it turns into a stone monkey that can already crawl and walk. As his eyes move, two beams of golden light shoot toward the Jade palace and startle the Jade Emperor. When he sees the light he orders two of his officers to investigate. They report the stone monkey, and that the light is dying down as the monkey eats and drinks. The Jade Emperor believes him to be nothing special.

On the mountain, the monkey joins a group of other wild monkeys. After playing, the monkeys regularly bathe in a stream.  One day, they decide to seek the source of the stream and climb the mountain to a waterfall. They declare that whoever goes through the waterfall, finds the stream's source, and comes out again will become their king. The stone monkey volunteers and jumps into the waterfall.

He finds a large iron bridge over rushing water, across which is a cave. He persuades the other monkeys to jump in also, and they make it into their home. Sun Wukong then reminds them of their prior declaration, so they declare him their king. He takes the throne and calls himself Handsome Monkey King (美猴王). This happiness does not last. When one of his older monkey friends dies, the Monkey King is very upset.  He decides to strike out from his island on a self-made raft, in search of an Immortal to teach him how to beat death.

He comes ashore and wanders around.  Humans see him and flee, uncertain of his ape-like appearance.  He takes some clothes that were left out to dry, and continues on foot.  His face hidden by a hood, he travels through towns and sees many examples of human degeneracy and vice.  He continues on and into a forest.  The Monkey King hears a Woodcutter singing an interesting song, and when questioning the Woodcutter about the origin he learns it was taught to the Woodcutter by an Immortal who resides in the forest.

The Monkey King comes to the entrance of a temple in which a magical taoist martial artist named Puti Zushi resides. Puti Zushi initially refuses to let him in, but the Monkey King refuses to leave, and waits outside the entrance for  months. Puti Zushi is impressed by the Monkey King's persistence, and allows him to enter. He accepts the Monkey King as a student and teaches him advanced Taoist practices, including the Way of Immortality, which he tells Sun Wukong it was his destiny to know. He later advises Sun Wukong never to needlessly show off his skills, because others might ask him to teach them, and if he does teach them, they may go on to cause trouble, but if he doesn't teach them, they will resent him for it.  He then forbids Sun Wukong from ever revealing who it was that taught him, and the loyal Monkey King promises never to reveal the identity of his Master. With that, Sun Wukong wakes up to find himself back in the forest, realizing that the many years he spent learning the Way had taken place in some form of compressed time trance.  Later, whenever Sun Wukong is asked about his powers and skills, he honestly replies that he learned everything in his dreams.

After the Monkey King returns, he learns that a demon called the Demon King of Confusion is kidnapping the monkeys of the Mountain of Flowers and Fruit to use as slaves. He subsequently kills the demon and his minions, saving the kidnapped monkeys. He also brings the entire weapon storage of a nearby country for his subjects, but is unable to find a weapon fit for himself. Upon hearing that Dragon Kings possess many treasures, he travels the oceans and finds the palace of a Dragon King.  At the entrance Sun Wukong asks for an introduction, but the Dragon King Ao Guang tells his guards to turn him away. Sun Wukong barges in any way, brushing off protests from the guards, insisting the Dragon King must be confused to turn away a fellow King.  Inside he introduces himself and encourages the Dragon King to give him a weapon.  Quickly realizing Sun Wukong is quite formidable, the Dragon King feigns willingness and hospitality, ordering his underlings to bring out weapon after weapon.  Sun Wukong tests each weapon, but none are robust enough for the Monkey King, who is unhappy at the situation.  Sun Wukong then acquires the golden-banded staff Ruyi Jingu Bang/Ding Hai Shen Zhen (如意金箍棒/定海神针), the stabilizer of the Four Seas and a treasure of Ao Guang, the dragon-king of the Eastern Seas. The Monkey King is the only creature strong enough to wield the staff-like weapon and there is an instant affinity between them. The golden-banded staff can change its size, elongate, fly, and attack opponents according to its master's will. It weighs 13,500  jīn  or 7960 kg. When not wielding the weapon, the Monkey King shrinks it down to the size of a sewing needle and stores it in his ear.

In addition to taking the magical staff, the Monkey King encourages the Dragon King to gift him attire fit for a King.  The Dragon King calls upon the other major Dragon Kings for assistance to source this for Sun Wukong, and they arrive and give Sun Wukong a golden chain mail shirt (鎖子黃金甲), a phoenix-feather cap, and cloud-walking boots. The phoenix-feather cap was one of the treasures of the dragon kings, a circlet of red gold adorned with phoenix feathers. Traditionally, it is depicted as a metal circlet with two striped feathers attached to the front, presumably the signature plumage of the Fenghuang or Chinese phoenix.  Sun Wukong thanks the Dragon Kings and leaves happy.

Upon his return to the mountain, he demonstrates the new weapon to his monkey tribe and draws the attention of other beastly powers, who seek to ally with him. He forms a fraternity with the Bull Demon King, the Saurian Demon King, the Single-horned Demon King, the Roc Demon King, the Lion Spirit King, the Macaque Spirit King, and the snub-nosed monkey Spirit King.

The Monkey King, now sentenced to death for extorting the Dragon Kings, then defies Hell's attempt to collect his soul. He wipes his name out of the Book of Life and Death, a collection of books claimed to have every name of every mortal alive and the ability to manipulate lifespan, along with the names of all monkeys known to him. The Dragon Kings and the Kings of Hell report him once again to the Jade Emperor. The heavenly army uses everything, even trying to erase him from existence altogether, but ultimately fail.

Havoc in Heaven
Hoping that a promotion and a rank amongst the gods will make him more manageable, the Jade Emperor invites the Monkey King to Heaven. The Monkey King believes he is receiving an honorable place as one of the gods as he is told he will be made 'Protector of the Horses' (a fancy term the Heavens coined for a stable-boy), the lowest job in heaven. When he discovers the importance of status in Heaven, and how he has been given the lowest position, the Monkey King sets the Cloud Horses free from the stable, then returns to his own kingdom and proclaims himself The Great Sage, Heaven's Equal.

The Heavens reluctantly recognize his self-proclaimed title after Gold Star advises the Jade Emperor against rushing into military action against the 'brash, rude and impudent' monkey, warning that failing to defeat Monkey would harm the reputation of Heaven.  Gold Star advises the Jade Emperor to superficially appease Sun Wukong's vanity while treating him as a pet, and invite him back to Heaven to keep him from causing trouble on earth.  The Jade Emperor agrees after Gold Star laughs that, in reality, the fanciful title is a meaningless joke revealing Sun Wukong's overconfidence and ignorance to the important workings of Heaven.

Sun Wukong suspects a trap but is happy when Gold Star, acting as an envoy, addresses him as Great Sage Equal of Heaven and presents him with official papers. Gold Star tells Sun Wukong he's been granted a far more important position as 'Guardian of the Heavenly Peach Garden,' which peach-loving Sun Wukong accepts. Later, when seven heavenly maidens are sent by the Queen Mother Xi Wangmu to pluck peaches for the Royal Banquet, Sun Wukong discovers every important god and goddess has been invited to the banquet except for him.  When he tells the maidens he is Great Sage Equal of Heaven, the maidens giggle, replying that everyone in Heaven knows he is merely an immortal who tends to the peach garden.  The Monkey King's indignation then turns to open defiance.

During the preparations for the Royal Banquet, Sun Wukong sneaks in to taste the fine foods and drink royal wine. In a tipsy state, the Monkey King roams Heaven while all the gods and goddesses are on their way to the banquet. He reaches high levels of the palace that the authorities of Heaven leave unguarded, for they can only be accessed by deities of the highest and purest spiritual power. Upon realizing that he is at the top of the 33 layers of the heavenly palace, Sun Wukong steals and consumes Laozi's Pills of Immortality and Xi Wangmu's Peaches of Immortality, takes the remainder of the Jade Emperor's royal wine, and then escapes back to his kingdom in preparation for his rebellion. 

The Jade Emperor refuses to accept Gold Star's counsel to find another peaceful way to deal with Sun Wukong and orders his forces to mobilize. Laughing continuously and fully enjoying himself, and with a combination of martial prowess, guile, and quick-witted creative responses to many different types of powerful Heavenly weapons used against him, the Monkey King single-handedly defeats the Army of Heaven's 100,000 celestial warriors, all 28 constellations, Nezha, and all of the Four Heavenly Kings. Then Guanyin, the Boddhisattva of Mercy and her disciple Muzha/Moksha arrive. Guanyin sends Muzha to inspect the situation and fight Sun Wukong. Muzha is defeated, then Guanyin suggests the Jade Emperor's nephew Erlang Shen fight Wukong. Wukong and Erlang are evenly matched and eventually both turn into terrifying figures, which scares Wukong's monkey army away. Sun Wukong is disheartened and turns into a fish to run away, then both of them keep shapeshifting to turn into more powerful things than the other, finally Laozi throws his Diamond Jade ring at Wukong from behind while he is fighting, knocking him senseless and enabling Erlang to bind him up.

After several failed attempts at execution, Sun Wukong is locked into Laozi's eight-way trigram crucible for 49 days in order to be distilled into an elixir by samadhi fires; this will allow Laozi to regain his pills of longevity. The fire of the crucible is hot enough to burn beings of so much unspeakable power, they rival Buddha himself.

However, when the cauldron is opened 49 days later, the Monkey King jumps out, having survived by hiding in a corner marked by the wind trigram, where there was less fire.  In fact, the heat from the samadhi fires have reinforced his bodily frame, making him stronger than ever before and impervious to greater damage. The heat also gives him a new ability; the Monkey King can now recognize evil with his new huǒyǎn-jīnjīng. Sun Wukong then proceeds to destroy the crucible and makes his way to Heaven's main chamber to confront the Jade Emperor and his senior advisors.

Imprisonment
The Jade Emperor and the authorities of Heaven appeal to the Buddha, who arrives from his temple in the West in person. After listening to Sun Wukong, he made a case that he should be the new Jade Emperor, the Buddha makes a bet that the Monkey King cannot escape from his palm. The Monkey King smugly accepts the bet. He leaps and flies all the way to the edge of the universe. Seeing nothing there but five towering pillars, the Monkey King believes that he has reached the ends of all existence. To prove his trail, he marks a pillar with a phrase declaring himself the Great Sage Equal to Heaven and urinates on the middle pillar. He then leaps back and returns to Buddha's palm to claim his victory in winning the bet. Sun Wukong is then very surprised to find that the five "pillars" he found are merely fingers of the Buddha's hand, finding it impossible to believe. When the Monkey King tries to escape the palm, Buddha turns his hand into a mountain of rocks, sending Sun Wukong hurtling back down to earth. Before the Monkey King can lift the mountain off, the Buddha seals him there, using a paper talisman bearing the mantra, Om Mani Padme Hum, in gold letters. The Monkey King remains imprisoned in stocks for five hundred years to 'learn patience and humility,' with only his head and hands protruding from the base of the mountain.  The Buddha arranges two earth spirits to feed the Monkey King iron pellets when he is hungry, and molten copper when he is thirsty.

Disciple to Tang Sanzang

Five hundred years later, the Bodhisattva Guanyin searches for disciples to protect a pilgrim on a journey to the West to retrieve the Buddhist sutras. In the hearing of this, the Monkey King offers to serve the pilgrim, Tang Sanzang, a monk of the Tang dynasty, in exchange for his freedom after the pilgrimage is complete. Understanding Sun Wukong will be difficult to control, Guanyin gives Tang Sanzang a gift from the Buddha: a magical circlet which, once the Monkey King is tricked into putting it on, can never be removed. When Tang Sanzang chants a certain sutra, the band will tighten and cause an unbearable headache. Guanyin gives the Monkey King three special hairs, only to be used in dire emergencies. Under Tang Sanzang's supervision, the Monkey King is allowed to journey to the West.

Throughout the novel, the Monkey King faithfully helps Tang Sanzang on his journey to India. They are joined by "Pigsy" and "Sandy", both of whom accompany the priest to atone for their previous crimes. Tang Sanzang's safety is constantly under threat from demons and other supernatural beings, as well as bandits, as they believe that by eating Tang Sanzang's flesh, one will obtain immortality and great power. The Monkey King often acts as Tang Sanzang's bodyguard to combat these threats. The group encounters a series of eighty-one tribulations before accomplishing their mission and returning safely to China. During the journey, the Monkey King learns about virtues and the teachings of Buddhism. There, the Monkey King attains Buddhahood, becoming the "Victorious Fighting Buddha", for his service and strength. We also see that Monkey king also knows about the fate of Tang Sangzang and also of his knowledge in many other things, as at three occasions he knew that the monk was supposed to suffer and he also cures a king who had been ill for many years, and he knows properties of herbs no one knew of.

Names and titles
Sun Wukong is known/pronounced as Suen Ng-hung in Cantonese, Son Gokū in Japanese, Son Oh Gong in Korean, Sun Ngō͘-Khong in Minnan, Tôn Ngộ Không in Vietnamese, Sung Ghokong or Sung Gokhong in Javanese, Sun Ngokong in Thai, "Wu Khone" in Arakanese and Sun Gokong in Malay and Indonesian.

Listed in the order that they were acquired:
 Shí Hóu Meaning the "Stone monkey." This refers to his physical essence, being born from a sphere of rock after millennia of incubation on the Bloom Mountains/Flower-Fruit Mountain.
 Měi Hóuwáng Meaning "Handsome Monkey-King," Houwang for short. The adjective Měi means "beautiful, handsome, pretty". It also means "to be pleased with oneself," referring to his ego. Hóu ("monkey") also highlights his "naughty and impish" character.
 Sūn Wùkōng The name given to him by his first master, Patriarch Bodhi (Subodhi). The surname Sūn was given as an in-joke about the monkey, as monkeys are also called húsūn (猢猻), and can mean either a literal or a figurative monkey (or a macaque). The surname sūn (孫) and the "monkey" sūn (猻) only differ in that the latter carries an extra "dog" (quǎn) radical to highlight that 猻 refers to an animal. The given name Wùkōng means "awakened to emptiness," sometimes translated as Aware of Vacuity.
 Bìmǎwēn The title of the keeper of the Heavenly Horses, a punning of bìmǎwēn (避馬瘟; lit. "avoiding the horses' plague"). A monkey was often put in a stable, as people believed its presence could prevent the horses from catching illness. Sun Wukong was given this position by the Jade Emperor after his first intrusion into Heaven. He was promised that it was a good position to have and that he would be in the highest position. After discovering it was one of the lowest jobs in Heaven, he became angry, smashed the entire stable, set the horses free, and then quit. From then on, the title bìmǎwēn was used by his adversaries to mock him.
 Qítiān Dàshèng Meaning "The Great Sage, Heaven's Equal." Wùkōng took this title suggested to him by one of his demon friends, after he wreaked havoc in heaven people who heard of him called him Great Sage (Dàshèng, 大聖). The title originally holds no power, though it is officially a high rank. The Jade Emperor later granted the title the responsibility to guard the Heavenly Peach Garden, keeping Sun Wukong busy so he would not make trouble.
 Xíngzhě Meaning "ascetic," it refers to a wandering monk, a priest's servant, or a person engaged in performing religious austerities. Tang Sanzang calls Wukong Sūn-xíngzhě when he accepts him as his companion. This is pronounced in Japanese as gyōja (making him Son-gyōja).
 Dòu-zhànshèng-fó (鬥戰勝佛) "Victorious Fighting Buddha." Wukong was given this name once he ascended to Buddhahood at the end of the Journey to the West. This name is also mentioned during the traditional Chinese Buddhist evening services, specifically during the eighty-eight Buddha's repentance.
 Líng-míngdàn-hóu "Intelligent Stone Monkey." Wukong is revealed to be one of the four spiritual primates that do not belong to any of the ten categories that all beings in the universe are classified under. His fellow spiritual primates are the Six-Eared Macaque (who is one of his antagonists in the main storyline), the Red-Bottomed Horse Monkey, and the Long-Armed Ape Monkey (neither of who make actual appearances, only mentioned in passing by the Buddha). The powers and abilities of each are equal to that of the others. 
 Sūn Zhǎnglǎo  Used as an honorific for a monk.

In addition to the names used in the novel, the Monkey King has other names in different languages:
Kâu-chê-thian in Minnan (Taiwan): "Monkey, Equal of Heaven."
Maa5 lau1 zing1 in Cantonese (Hong Kong and Guangdong): "Monkey Imp" (Called so by his enemies).

Immortality 
Sun Wukong gained immortality through seven different means, which together made him one of the most immortal and invincible beings in all of creation.

Disciple to Puti Zushi 
After feeling down about the future and death, Wukong sets out to find the immortal Taoist patriarch Puti Zushi to learn how to be immortal. There, Wukong learns spells to grasp all five elements and cultivate the way of immortality, as well as the 72 Earthly Transformations. After seven years of training with the sage, Wukong gains the secret formula to immortality. It is noted that the Court of Heaven does not approve of this method of immortality.

Book of Mortals 
In the middle of the night, Wukong's soul is tied up and dragged to the World of Darkness. He is informed there that his life in the human world has come to an end. In anger, Wukong fights his way through the World of Darkness to complain to "The Ten Kings," who are the judges of the dead. The Ten Kings try to address the complaint and calm Wukong by saying many people in the world have the same name and the fetchers of the dead may have gotten the wrong name. Wukong demands to see the register of life and death, then scribbles out his name, thus making him untouchable by the fetchers of death, along with the names of all of the monkeys in his tribe. It is because Wukong has learned magic/magical arts as a disciple to Puti Zushi that he can scare the Ten Kings, demanding from them the book of mortals and removing his name, thus making him even more immortal. After this incident, the Ten Kings complain to the Jade Emperor.

Peach of Immortality 
Soon after the Ten Kings complain to the Jade Emperor, the Court of Heaven appoints Sun Wukong as "Keeper of the Heavenly Horses," a fancy name for a stable boy. Angered by this, Wukong rebels and the Havoc in Heaven begins. During the Havoc in Heaven, Wukong is assigned to be the "Guardian of the Heavenly Peach Garden." The garden includes three types of peaches, each of which grant over 3,000 years of life. The first type blooms every three thousand years; anyone who eats it will become immortal, and their body will become both light and strong. The second type blooms every six thousand years; anyone who eats it will be able to fly and enjoy eternal youth. The third type blooms every nine thousand years; anyone who eats it will become "eternal as heaven and earth, as long-lived as the sun and moon." While serving as the guardian, Wukong does not hesitate to eat the peaches, thus granting him immortality and the abilities that come with the peaches. If Wukong had not been appointed as the Guardian of the Heavenly Peach Garden, he would not have eaten the Peaches of Immortality and would not have gained another level of immortality.

Heavenly Wine 
Because of Wukong's rebellious antics, Wukong is not considered as an important celestial deity and is thus not invited to the Queen Mother of the West's royal banquet. After finding out that every other important deity was invited, Wukong impersonates one of the deities that was invited and shows up early to see why the banquet is important. He immediately is distracted by the aroma of the wine and decides to steal and drink it. The heavenly wine has the ability to turn anyone who drinks it to an immortal.

Pills of Longevity 
While drunk from the heavenly wine, Wukong stumbles into Laozi's alchemy lab, where he finds Laozi's pills of longevity, known as "The Immortals' Greatest Treasure." Filled with curiosity about the pills, Wukong eats a gourd of them. Those who eat the pills will become immortal. If Wukong had not been drunk from the heavenly wine, he would not have stumbled into Laozi's alchemy lab and eaten the pills of longevity.

Aftermath of Immortality 
Following Wukong's three cause-and-effect methods of immortality during his time in heaven, he escapes back to his home at the Mountain of Flowers and Fruit. The Court of Heaven finds out what Wukong has done and a battle to capture Wukong ensues. Due to the five levels of immortality Wukong has achieved, his body has become nearly invincible and thus survives the multiple execution attempts by heaven. In the notable last execution, Wukong was placed inside Laozi's furnace in hopes that he will be distilled into the elixir of the pills of immortality. Wukong survives 49 days of the samadhi fire in Laozi's furnace and gains the ability to recognize evil; meanwhile, being refined in the crucible extracts yet more of the impurities of mortality and leaves him with another immortality. In desperation, the Court of Heaven seeks help from Buddha, who finally imprisons Wukong under a mountain. Wukong's immortality and abilities ultimately come into use after Guanyin suggests he become a disciple of Tang Sanzang in the Journey to the West. In the story, he protects Sanzang from evil demons who wish to eat Sanzang to achieve immortality. Wukong's own immortality protects him from the various ways the demons try to kill him, such as fighting, beheading, disemboweling, poisoning, and boiling oil.

Sometime during the journey, Wukong and his companions obtain Ginseng fruit (人參果; Man-fruit), a fruit even rarer and more powerful than the Peaches of Immortality, as only 30 of them will grow off one particular tree only found on the Longevity Mountain (萬壽山) every 10,000 years. While one smell can grant 360 years of life, consuming one will grant another 47,000 years of life.

In addition to all of the immortality-granting wines and medicines that the Monkey King had consumed while in heaven, upon reaching the Buddha's temple, pilgrims were provided with Buddhist equivalents of such foods, therefore making Sun Wukong even more immortal; an 8-fold immortal.

In Xiyoubu
The brief satirical novel Xiyoubu (西遊補, "Supplement to the Journey to the West," c. 1640) follows Sun as he is trapped in a magical dream world created by the Qing Fish Demon, the embodiment of desire (情, qing). Sun travels back and forth through time, during which he serves as the adjunct King of Hell and judges the soul of the recently dead traitor Qin Hui during the Song dynasty, takes on the appearance of a beautiful concubine and causes the downfall of the Qin dynasty, and faces King Paramita, one of his five sons born to the demoness Princess Iron Fan, on the battlefield during the Tang dynasty. The events of the Xiyoubu take place between the end of chapter 61 and the beginning of chapter 62 of Journey to the West. The author, Tong Yue (童說), wrote the book because he wanted to create an opponent—in this case, desire-itself—that Sun could not defeat with his great strength and martial skill.

Influence

 In The Shaolin Monastery (2008), Tel Aviv University Professor Meir Shahar claims that Sun influenced a legend concerning the origins of the Shaolin staff method. The legend takes place during the Red Turban Rebellion of the Yuan dynasty. Bandits lay siege to the monastery, but it is saved by a lowly kitchen worker wielding a long fire poker as a makeshift staff. He leaps into the oven and emerges as a monstrous giant big enough to stand astride both Mount Song and the imperial fort atop Shaoshi Mountain (which are five miles apart). The bandits flee upon seeing him. The Shaolin monks later realize that the kitchen worker was the Monastery's local guardian deity, Vajrapani, in disguise. Shahar compares the worker's transformation in the stove with Sun Wukong's time in Laozi's crucible, their use of the staff, and the fact that Sun Wukong and his weapon can both grow to gigantic proportions.
Chinese DAMPE satellite is nicknamed after Wu Kong. The name could be understood as "understand the void" literally, relates to the undiscovered dark matter.

Television, comics and animation

The character of Son Goku in Dragon Ball is based on Sun Wukong, as attested by his monkey tail, staff, and name (which is simply the Japanese reading of the same name in Chinese: "孫悟空").
The manga-anime series Saiyuki Sun Wukong counterpart also uses the Japanese reading Son Goku.
The character of Mushra in the Toei Animation Anime Shinzo is based on Sun Wukong, retaining the character's golden headband and telescoping staff.
The character of Monkey in the 1978 Japanese television series Monkey is based on Sun Wukong.
The character of Kongo in Monkey Magic is based on Sun Wukong.
In The God of High School, the protagonist Mori Jin's is based on the God Sun Wukong.
The character Sun Wukong in RWBY is based on the lore; but instead of using his hair to make the clones, he can make the clones using RWBY's magic system.
The character of Sun Wukong, explicitly said to be the trickster of legend, plays a major role in the DreamWorks animated series Kung Fu Panda: The Paws of Destiny. 
The main character of Jesse Dart Spaceketeers is based on the monkey king in Force Five, where he wears a golden band around his head that is controlled by the princess, and which may induce agony as well. The golden band is also his primary weapon, a long javelin that decreases in size and shape.
Marvel Comics features their own version of Sun Wukong. This version was a crime lord, styled after the famed character, who steals the original staff and encounters the spirit of the real Monkey King. After being punished by being sent to hell, he escapes and decides to devote himself to fighting evil as repentance.
DC Comics' Sun Wukong has a human son named Marcus Sun who discovers his parentage and takes up the superhero codename of Monkey Prince.
In 2021, Sunrise Inc. has released an animation series SD Gundam World Heroes, under the SD Gundam franchise. in which feature Sun Wukong as a protagonist along with other mythical characters in novels.

Video games
In Dota 2, there is a hero called Sun Wukong. His backstory also roughly follows the story of Journey to the West.
In Heroes of the Storm, a legendary skin is based on Sun Wukong.
League of Legends has a champion based on Wukong.

 Warframe features a playable character named Wukong, who is modelled on the Monkey King and possesses abilities based on those described in Journey to the West.

In Mobile Legends: Bang Bang the character Sun is based on Sun Wukong.
In Honor of Kings, the character Sun Wukong is based on the Monkey King.
Sun Wukong is one of twelve mythological heroes that civilizations can summon in Civilization VI'''s Heroes and Legends Mode.
In Totally Accurate Battle Simulator, the Monkey King is a playable unit from the dynasty faction.
 In the Megami Tensei and Persona series, Seiten Taisei (also known as Wukong) is one of the available Demons/Persona the player can befriend or, in the latter game, fight alongside.
 In Pokémon Diamond and Pearl, Infernape's design appears to be based on Sun Wukong.
 In Divine Knockout, Sun Wukong is a playable God.
 In the mobile game Nono Islands, Sun Wukong is a playable character
Sun Wukong is the primary protagonist in the game Black Myth: Wukong, referred to in the game as "the Destined One" (天命人).

See also
:Category: Locations in Chinese mythology
 List of media adaptations of Journey to the West
 Monkey King Festival
 Birthday of the Monkey God
 Dafo Temple (Zhangye) – contains a Qing Dynasty mural featuring Monkey and other characters from the novel)

References

External links

 Sun Wukong Character Profile A detailed character profile of Sun Wukong, with character history, listing and explanations of his various names and titles, detailed information on his weapon, abilities, powers, and skills, and personality.
 Story of Sun Wukong with manhua
 Sun Wukong's entry at Godchecker is a tongue-in-cheek take on the Great Sage.
  Journey to the West''

Male characters in literature
Journey to the West characters
Fictional Chinese people in literature
Fictional shapeshifters
Fictional monkeys
Mythological monkeys
Trickster gods
Magic gods
Chinese gods
Buddhism in China
Fictional Buddhist monks
Fictional characters who can change size
Fictional characters who can duplicate themselves
Fictional characters who can move at superhuman speeds
Fictional characters who use magic
Fictional stick-fighters